Duvaucelia manicata is a species of dendronotid nudibranch. It is a marine gastropod mollusc in the family Tritoniidae.

Distribution
This species was described from France. It is known from the Mediterranean Sea north to south-west England.

Ecology
The diet of this species is a soft coral.

References

Tritoniidae
Gastropods described in 1853